= Middle East & Africa to 1875 =

Book by Sanderson Beck

Middle East & Africa to 1875 is Volume 1 of Ethics of Civilization, written by Sanderson Beck. The product description states the book "describes the history, ethics, and literature of ancient Sumer, Egypt, Israel, Assyria, Babylon Persia, as well as Islamic culture, North Africa, West Africa, East Africa, and southern Africa up to 1875."
